Black Orpheus  is a 1959 film directed by Marcel Camus. Black Orpheus may also refer to:
Black Orpheus (album), a 2003 album by Keziah Jones
 Black Orpheus (magazine) founded by Ulli Beier in 1957
"Manhã de Carnaval" (sometimes called "Black Orpheus"), a jazz standard by Luiz Bonfá from the film's soundtrack
 "Orphée Noir", a 1948 essay by Jean-Paul Sartre

See also 
Orpheus (disambiguation)